Pochta is a rural locality (a khutor) in Gornovodyanovskoye Rural Settlement, Dubovsky District, Volgograd Oblast, Russia. The population was 8 as of 2010.

Geography 
Pochta is located in steppe, 25 km north of Dubovka (the district's administrative centre) by road. Gornovodyanoye is the nearest rural locality.

References 

Rural localities in Dubovsky District, Volgograd Oblast